Picsou Magazine is a French magazine featuring characters from the Scrooge McDuck universe, as Balthazar Picsou ("coin pincher") is the French name of Scrooge McDuck. The magazine was started in March 1972. It was published on a monthly basis by Disney Hachette Presse, which has a license from the Walt Disney Company for producing and distributing Disney comics in France. In 2020, Unique Heritage Media bought Disney Hachette Presse.

See also

Uncle Scrooge

References

External links
 Official website
 
 WorldCat record

1972 comics debuts
1972 establishments in France
Children's magazines published in France
Comics magazines published in France
Disney comics titles
French-language magazines
Lagardère Active
Magazines about comics
Magazines established in 1972
Monthly magazines published in France